Everything Is Beautiful is the fourth studio album by American rapper Princess Nokia. It was released on February 26, 2020, on the same day as their third studio album, Everything Sucks. The album was meant to represent the "sensitive, feminine side of Princess Nokia" and was recorded mostly with live instrumentation. The album was preceded by the single, "Green Eggs & Ham". The album received positive reviews from critics.

Production 
The album was recorded over two years in New York, Los Angeles, and Puerto Rico.

Critical reception 

The album received generally favourable reviews from critics. At Metacritic, which assigns a normalized rating out of 100 to reviews from professional publications, the album received an average score of 75, based on 6 reviews. Reviewing the album in his Substack-published "Consumer Guide" column, Robert Christgau said the album is "not beautiful, exactly—more cute like the piano parts, which, while not exactly pop because she doesn't exactly have the pipes, color if not define every one of these 12 chirpy, chin-up tracks."

Track listing

Personnel 
 Princess Nokia – vocals
 Andy Park – mixing
 Joe LaPorta – mastering
 Adam Pallin – producer 
 Carlostruly – producer 
 Tony Seltzer – producer 
 A. Lau – producer 
 Oshun – vocals 
 Onyx Collective – vocals , producer 
 Proda – producer 
 Terrace Martin – vocals , producer 
 Justus West – producer 
 Chris Lare – producer

References 

2020 albums
Princess Nokia albums
Self-released albums
Albums produced by Adam Pallin
Albums produced by Terrace Martin